Aya is a rural locality (a selo) and the administrative center of Aysky Selsoviet, Altaysky District, Altai Krai, Russia. The population was 2,233 as of 2013. There are 23 streets.

Geography 
Aya is located on the Katun River, 43 km east of Altayskoye (the district's administrative centre) by road. Dubrovka is the nearest rural locality.

References 

Rural localities in Altaysky District, Altai Krai